Kommon is a village in the commune of Banikoara in the Alibori Department of northern Benin.

References

External links

Populated places in the Alibori Department
Commune of Banikoara